Scythris gratiosella is a moth of the family Scythrididae. It was described by Eberhard Jäckh in 1978. It is found in Spain.

References

gratiosella
Moths described in 1978